Davos Dorf railway station is a railway station in the municipality of Davos, in the Swiss canton of Grisons. It is an intermediate stop on the  Landquart–Davos Platz line of the Rhaetian Railway.

Northbound, there is an hourly service towards Landquart. Southbound, there is an hourly service to Davos Platz. The station also serves as a hub for local bus services. Davos Platz station is located about 2.5 km southwest of Davos Dorf.

The station currently has one platform in use, served by trains in both directions.

Services
The following services stop at Davos Dorf:

 Regio: limited service between Landquart and Davos Platz.

References

External links
 
 
 

Railway stations in Switzerland opened in 1890
Railway stations in Graubünden
Rhaetian Railway stations
Davos